Erik Mathews Flowers (born March 1, 1978) is a former professional American and Canadian football defensive end and linebacker. He was drafted in the first round (26th overall) of the 2000 NFL Draft by the Buffalo Bills. He played college football at Arizona State and Trinity Valley Community College.

In his career, Flowers was also a member of the Houston Texans, Pittsburgh Steelers, St. Louis Rams, and Atlanta Falcons of the National Football League (NFL). He was also a member of the Toronto Argonauts of the Canadian Football League (CFL). His son, Dimitri Flowers, has played fullback for the New York Jets and Jacksonville Jaguars.

Professional career

Flowers was selected in the first round (26th overall) of the 2000 NFL Draft by the Buffalo Bills. On July 23, 2000, he signed his rookie contract. As a rookie, he appeared in 16 games. He recorded 20 tackles and two sacks. In 2001, he was named a starter at defensive end. He appeared in 15 games (six starts total). He recorded 21 tackles and two sacks. He was released, on August 20, during training camp the next year, and was claimed off waivers by the Houston Texans. In his lone season with the Texans, he appeared in 14 games and recorded four tackles. He was released on September 2, 2003 during final cuts by the Texans, the next day he was claimed off waivers by the Pittsburgh Steelers. He was released 13 days later. On December 4, 2003, he was signed by the St. Louis Rams and was converted to linebacker. For the season, he appeared in four games and recorded two tackles. For the 2004 season, he appeared in nine games and recorded 11 tackles and one sack. On August 1, 2005, he was signed by the Atlanta Falcons. He was cut on August 31, 2005.

On March 6, 2006, Flowers signed with the Toronto Argonauts of the Canadian Football League (CFL) as defensive end. However, he suffered a back injury which prevented him from reporting to the Argonauts' training camp which began in late May.

References

1978 births
Living people
American football defensive ends
American football linebackers
Trinity Valley Cardinals football players
Arizona State Sun Devils football players
Buffalo Bills players
Houston Texans players
Pittsburgh Steelers players
St. Louis Rams players
Players of American football from San Antonio
Players of Canadian football from San Antonio